A sophomore slump or sophomore jinx, sophomore jitters, second-album syndrome (in the musical sense of the term), etc., refers to an instance in which a second, or sophomore, effort fails to live up to the relatively high standards of the first effort. 

It is commonly used to refer to the apathy of students (second year of high school, college or university), the performance of athletes (second season of play), singers/bands (second album), television shows (second seasons), films and video games (sequels/prequels).

In the United Kingdom, the "sophomore slump" is more commonly referred to as "second year blues", particularly when describing university students. In Australia, it is known as "second year syndrome", and is particularly common when referring to professional athletes who have a mediocre second season following a stellar debut.

The phenomenon of a "sophomore slump" can be explained psychologically, where earlier success has a reducing effect on the subsequent effort, but it can also be explained statistically, as an effect of the regression towards the mean.

Industry-specific terms 
In music, a similar trend to the sophomore slump is the difficult second album, difficult third album, or second-album syndrome, which is often characterized by struggles in changing musical style. Examples include the Doors' Waiting for the Sun, Joe Jackson's Beat Crazy, Bauhaus' The Sky's Gone Out, and Killing Joke's Revelations. Artists such as Billy Bragg, Dr. Strangely Strange, Black Reindeer, Roddy Ricch' Live Life Fast, and more recently Jack Harlow's Come Home the Kids Miss You   have referenced the effect in their respective album titles and artwork. American indie rock band Grandaddy used a double entendre for their second album, titled The Sophtware Slump.

In English football, second season syndrome is the phrase that is used to describe a downturn in fortunes for a football club in its second season after its promotion to the Premier League, particularly if the first season after promotion had brought a strong finish.

See also
Regression toward the mean
Second-system effect

External links
Howard Wainer (2007), "The Most Dangerous Equation", American Scientist 95

References 
English phrases
Terminology used in multiple sports